Air Marshal Sunderraman Neelakantan PVSM, YSM, VM, is a retired officer and was Air Officer Commanding-in-Chief (AOC-in-C), Southern Air Command of the Indian Air Force from 1 August 2016 to 1 March 2017. He was succeeded by Air Marshal Rakesh Kumar Singh Bhadauria.

Career
Neelakantan was commissioned as a fighter pilot in Indian Air Force in December 1977. He is an alumnus of National Defence Academy and Defence Services Staff College, Wellington and Tactics and Air Combat Development Establishment (TACDE). He is a recipient of Presidential awards Param Vishisht Seva Medal the Yudh Seva Medal and the Vayu Sena Medal.

A flight instructor and Fighter Combat Leader, he has flown over 3100 hours on various types of aircraft, and commanded a frontline fighter squadron and two flying bases. During 2006–07, he led the IAF contingent in Congo as part of the United Nations Peace Keeping Force.

He served as Director General of Inspection & Safety at Air Headquarters from 1 July 2014 to 1 February 2015.  He also served as Air Officer in charge Personnel (AOP) at Air Headquarters (Vayu Bhawan) from 2 February 2015 to 31 July 2016.

Personal life
Neelakantan is married to Uma Neelakantan. Together they have a daughter and a son. He is an active sportsman who plays golf, cricket and badminton. He is a qualified open water scuba diver. His hobbies include cooking, reading and travel.

Awards and medals 
In his 40 years of career, Neelakantan has been awarded several medals: the Param Vishisht Seva Medal (January 2017), the Yudh Seva Medal and the Vayu Sena Medal (Gallantry).

References

Indian Air Force air marshals
Living people
Year of birth missing (living people)
Defence Services Staff College alumni
National Defence Academy (India) alumni